Richard Henders is a British actor.

He is best known for his portrayal of Prince Rilian in the 1990 BBC adaptation of The Silver Chair. He has also appeared in dramas such as Pie in the Sky, Foyle's War and The Inspector Lynley Mysteries. In 2004, Henders received an Olivier Award nomination  for his performance in Pacific Overtures at London's Donmar Warehouse. He also played the role of Merry in the 2007 musical production of The Lord of the Rings at the Theatre Royal, Drury Lane. Henders currently lives in London.

References

External links

Living people
Year of birth missing (living people)
British stage actors
British film actors
British television actors
British male musical theatre actors